Wolston Correctional Centre is an Australian high-security prison facility in Wacol, Queensland, Australia. Wolston is a 'protection' prison, and as such houses many paedophiles, sex offenders and high-profile prisoners.

In addition to those classes of prisoner mentioned above, the majority of prisoners at Wolston Correctional Centre are non-sex-offender prisoners, who have been transferred to the protection prison from other mainstream prisons because they have provided information to prison authorities about fellow inmates and their safety has been threatened. These types of prisoners are known as "informers", or more colloquially in prison slang as "dogs".

Like most Queensland prisons, Wolston Correctional Centre is severely overcrowded, with some cells designed for a single prisoner accommodating two or more prisoners. This is often achieved by requiring one or more of the prisoners to sleep on the floor. Such overcrowding has led to a dramatic increase in violent assaults as such cramped living conditions increases psychological stress and discomfort of inmates. It is also often the prison guards who become the victims of such assaults, as reported in a 2018 ABC News article.

Notable prisoners
 Mohamed Haneefan Indian doctor accused of aiding terrorists
 Leonard Fraserserial killer
 Massimo "Max" Sica – convicted of the triple murder of his former girlfriend and two siblings
 Gerard Baden-ClayMurderer - convicted and sentenced to life imprisonment for the murder of his wife Alison Baden-Clay
 Brett Peter Cowanserial pedophile convicted and sentenced to life imprisonment for murdering Queensland school boy Daniel Morcombe
 Rick Thorburn – convicted of murdering foster daughter Tialeigh Palmer and sentenced to life imprisonment with non-parole of 20 years
 Paul Pisasale - former Lord Mayor of Ipswich convicted of extortion

See also

 List of Australian prisons

References

External links
Wolston Correctional Centre
Prisoner Violence at record levels (ABC News article)

1999 establishments in Australia
Prisons in Queensland
Wacol, Queensland